Eunectes deschauenseei, commonly known as the dark-spotted anaconda or De Schauensee's anaconda, is a species of snake in the subfamily Boinae of the family Boidae. The species is native to northeastern South America. Like all boas, it is a nonvenomous constrictor. No subspecies are currently recognized.

Taxonomy
The specific name, deschauenseei, is in honor of American ornithologist Rodolphe Meyer de Schauensee, who donated a specimen to the Philadelphia Zoo in 1924. The type locality given is "probably collected on the island of Marajo at the mouth of the Amazon".

Distribution and habitat
Eunectes deschauenseei is found in South America, in northern Brazil (the Pará and Amapá states) and French Guiana. E. deschauenseei is a semi-aquatic species usually found in swampy, seasonally flooded freshwater areas at elevations below .

Description
Adult males of E. deschauenseei measure  and adult females  in snout-to-vent length (SVL).

Reproduction
Vitellogenesis in E. deschauenseei probably occurs from autumn to spring (May to December). Gestation may last as long as nine months. Litter size among five gravid females ranged from 3 to 27 (mean 10.6). Newborns measure  in snout–vent length.

Conservation
The savanna habitat of E. deschauenseei is highly threatened by agricultural expansion, but the threat posed on this species is not known.

References

Further reading

 (Eunectes deschauenseei, new species).

deschauenseei
Snakes of South America
Reptiles of Brazil
Reptiles of French Guiana
Reptiles described in 1936
Taxa named by Emmett Reid Dunn